Thomas Thành Thái Nguyễn (born April 7, 1953) is a Vietnamese-born American bishop of the Roman Catholic Church who has been serving as an auxiliary bishop for the Diocese of Orange in Southern California since 2017.

Biography

Early life 
Thomas Nguyễn was born on April 7, 1953, in Nha Trang, Vietnam. On May 11, 1991, Nguyen was ordained to the priesthood by Auxiliary Bishop Peter Rosazza for the order of Missionaries of Our Lady of La Salette.  

From there, Nguyễn was incardinated into, or transferred to, the Diocese of St. Augustine. There he served as pastor of Christ the King Parish and St. Joseph Catholic Parish in Jacksonville, Florida.

Auxiliary Bishop of Orange
Pope Francis appointed Nguyễn as auxiliary bishop for the Diocese of Orange on October 6, 2017.   On December 19, 2017, Nguyen was consecrated as a bishop by Bishop Kevin Vann.

See also

 Catholic Church hierarchy
 Catholic Church in the United States
 Historical list of the Catholic bishops of the United States
 List of Catholic bishops of the United States
 Lists of patriarchs, archbishops, and bishops

References

External links

Roman Catholic Diocese of Orange Official Site

Episcopal succession

 

1953 births 
Living people
People from Khánh Hòa Province
Vietnamese emigrants to the United States
21st-century Roman Catholic bishops in the United States
Bishops appointed by Pope Francis